Toney J. Lister (born May 26, 1946) is an American politician. He served as a member of the South Carolina House of Representatives.

Life and career 
Lister was born in Spartanburg, South Carolina. He attended the University of South Carolina and the University of South Carolina School of Law.

In 1974, Lister was elected to the South Carolina House of Representatives, serving until 1979.

In 1994, Lister was appointed to represent the 7th Judicial Circuit of the USC Board of Trustees.

References 

1946 births
Living people
Politicians from Spartanburg, South Carolina
Members of the South Carolina House of Representatives
20th-century American politicians
University of South Carolina alumni
University of South Carolina School of Law alumni